Matthew Rosamond VC (12 July 1823 – 14 July 1866) was an English recipient of the Victoria Cross, the highest and most prestigious award for gallantry in the face of the enemy that can be awarded to British and Commonwealth forces.

The christening record for Matthew Rosamond in 1823 shows his parents as George Rosamond and his wife Elizabeth.  Matthew Rosamond married Bridget Mahoney in Agra, West Bengal on 21 July 1851.  The English 1861 census for Eaton Socon in Bedfordshire, shows Matthew Rosamond home from India five years before his death. Just prior to his death, he married Alice Wollen in 1865 in Serampore, Bengal, India.

Rosamond was born in the village of St. Neots, Huntingdonshire (some records say Swallow Cliffe, Wiltshire; other says Seaton Town, Bedfordshire), the son and grandson of soldiers.

Victoria Cross
Rosamund was 33 years old, and a sergeant-major in the 37th Bengal Native Infantry, Bengal Army during the Indian Mutiny when the following deed on 4 June 1857 at Benares led to the award of the Victoria Cross for Rosamund,  Sergeant-Major Peter Gill and Private John Kirk:

Rosamund later achieved the rank of lieutenant but died on board ship and was buried in the Red Sea at the age of 43. His VC medal was sold at auction in 1903 and has not been located since.

A blue plaque has been erected in the village of Eaton Socon in Bedfordshire with the correct spelling of his surname which reads "Matthew Rosamond VC – On 4th June 1857 Matthew Rosamond, a relative of the Rosamond bakers on this site, won the Victoria Cross during the Indian Mutiny. He died on the Red Sea on 14th July 1866 and was buried at sea. This building was built by Budd's Bakers as a new bakehouse around 1930, replacing a much older timber framed property."

References

British recipients of the Victoria Cross
British Indian Army officers
British East India Company Army soldiers
1823 births
1866 deaths
Indian Rebellion of 1857 recipients of the Victoria Cross
People from St Neots
Burials at sea
Military personnel from Cambridgeshire